The FIBA Europe is the governing body for Basketball in Europe. It organises Three main Active club competitions for women: the Euroleague (formerly European Cup), the EuroCup Women, and the FIBA Europe Super Cup. there is also another former fiba Europe club competition for women such as the Ronchetti Cup Existed between the years 1972 to 2002. 
Former Soviet and present Latvian side TTT Riga have won a record total of 19 titles in FIBA Europe competitions, nine more than Spartak Moscow from (Russia). 
Spartak Moscow is the only team to have won all FIBA Europe women's club competitions.

The Soviet clubs have won the most titles (30), ahead of clubs from Russia (27) and Italy (22).

Winners

By club

The following table lists all the women's clubs that have won at least one FIBA Europe club competition, and is updated as of 10 April 2022 (in chronological order).

Key

By country
The following table lists all the countries whose clubs have won at least one FIBA Europe competition, and is updated as of 10 April 2022 (in chronological order).

Key

See also
FIBA Europe

References

External links
 FIBA Europe Official Webpage

 

FIBA Europe
FIBA Europe women's club competition winners
Basketball statistics